The Californian turkey (Meleagris californica) is an extinct species of turkey that lived during the Pleistocene and Early Holocene epochs in California. It has been estimated that the Californian turkey went extinct about 10,000 years ago.
 
Fossil evidence indicates that the Californian turkey was stockier than the wild turkey of the eastern United States, with a shorter, wider beak, but was largely similar otherwise. It is a very common fossil in the La Brea Tar Pits. Size-wise, though, the California turkey might have been intermediate in size between the smaller southwestern turkey (Meleagris crassipes) and the larger North American wild turkey (Meleagris gallopavo).

The extinction of this species is thought to have been caused by a combination of drought, which would have forced turkeys to restrict their lives to areas close to water sources, and overhunting  by humans who had arrived relatively recently in the region.

This species was originally described as a type of peafowl by Miller in 1909 and placed in the genus Pavo with that bird.  Years later he reclassified it as an intermediate between the Indian peafowl and the ocellated turkey. But it eventually was seen as a close relative of modern extant wild turkeys.

Distribution and origin
"The unquestionable geographic range of M. californica extended from Orange County in the south (Imperial Highway), through Los Angeles County (Rancho La Brea and probably also Workman and Alhambra Streets), to Santa Barbara County in the north (Carpinteria)."

During the Miocene, Californian turkeys probably originated from other turkey populations that have become restricted to southern California. However, the similarities between the Californian and wild turkey suggest the former, following isolation of their ancestors, may have faced similar evolutionary pressures when compared to their mainland relatives.

The xeric desert topography that prevails now in southeastern California and western Arizona may have prevented its neighbor, the wild turkey, from exchanging genes with one another. This would therefore indicate the California turkey has been an isolated species separated from the more abundant wild turkey for some time before their extinction.

References

 Physical Geography of North America, by Antony Orme
 https://blogs.scientificamerican.com/guest-blog/california-s-wild-turkey-troubles/

Meleagris
Pleistocene birds of North America
Fauna of California
Pleistocene California
Quaternary California
Holocene North America
Pleistocene first appearances
Holocene extinctions
Extinct birds of North America
Extinct animals of the United States